Branchinella ornata is a species within the family Thamnocephalidae. This fairy shrimp species is found in parts of Southern Africa, notably the Sua and Nwetwe Pans of the Makgadikgadi Pans in Botswana.

See also
 Branchinella spinosa

References

Branchiopoda
Crustaceans described in 1910
Freshwater crustaceans of Africa